The flag of Alberta is an official symbol of the province of Alberta,  Canada. In 1968, the provincial legislature authorized the design of a flag, adopting it on 1 June 1968.

The flag has the proportions 1:2, with the provincial shield of arms in the centre of an ultramarine blue background.  The shield's height is  that of the flag's height.

The provincial colours, adopted in 1984, are blue and gold (deep yellow); they are also referred to as "Alberta blue" and "Alberta gold", appearing on the flag/shield in the sky/background and wheat background, respectively.

In 2001, a survey conducted by the North American Vexillological Association (NAVA) placed the Alberta provincial flag 35th in design quality out of the 72 Canadian provincial, U.S. state, and U.S. territory flags ranked.

History
Around the time of the upcoming centennial celebration of Canadian Confederation petitions were submitted in November 1966 to Premier Ernest Charles Manning by the Social Credit Women's Auxiliaries of the Alberta Social Credit League to give Alberta its own unique flag. The flag was designed and approved as the official provincial flag by the Alberta legislature on June 1, 1968.

The Calgary Flames used the flag as a shoulder patch on their home and away uniforms from 2007 to 2020.

Gallery

See also
List of Canadian provincial and territorial symbols
Coat of arms of Alberta
Symbols of Alberta

References

Sources
 Franco, Guida (2006). Canadian Almanac & Directory 2006. Toronto: Micromedia ProQuest. .

External links

 Legislative Assembly of Alberta – The Citizen's Guide to the Alberta Legislature, Part V: The Emblems of Alberta
 Arms and flag of Alberta in the online Public Register of Arms, Flags and Badges

Flag
Flags of Canada
Flags introduced in 1968